Anaqua is a Boston,  Massachusetts-based provider of intellectual asset (IA) management and software and services. Anaqua’s Enterprise IAM software and services supports the IA lifecycle from idea to monetization for all IA categories, including inventions, patents, trade secrets, brands, and trademarks. Anaqua Express is designed for smaller IP teams. Anaqua Element is a cloud-based software service for IP professionals managing small portfolios. Anaqua Essential helps law firms manage intellectual assets on behalf of clients.

History
Anaqua was formed in 2004 and bought by Beacon Equity Partners in 2005.
In 2006, Anaqua received $4 million from Northstar Global Partners, which they used to relocate headquarters from London to Boston and hire more staff.  In 2010, Anaqua merged with SGA2, an ISO 9000-certified supplier of global patent annuity and trademark renewal services.  In 2013, Beacon Equity Partners sold Anaqua to Insight Venture Partners.

Priya Iyer joined Anaqua as the chief operating officer in 2005, and became CEO in 2007.

Anaqua merged with Lecorpio, LLC, announced on July 25, 2017.

References

External links
 Official website

Companies based in Boston
Cloud computing providers
Intellectual property law
American companies established in 2004 
Business services companies established in 2004
2004 establishments in Massachusetts
Software companies established in 2004
Software companies based in Massachusetts